Karlskoga Municipality (Karlskoga kommun) is a municipality in Örebro County in central Sweden. Its seat is located in the city of Karlskoga. Other localities include Valåsen och Labbsand, Kortfors, Linnebäck and Villingsberg.

Karlskoga was formed as rural municipality when the first Swedish local government acts came into force in 1863. In 1925 the southern part was detached, forming Degerfors Municipality. In 1940 the whole municipality, including its non-urban areas, got the title of a city. These titles were abolished in 1971.

Riksdag elections

Twin towns – sister cities

Karlskoga is twinned with:

 Aalborg, Denmark
 Fredrikstad, Norway
 Húsavík, Iceland
 Ivangorod, Russia
 Narva, Estonia
 Olaine, Latvia
 Riihimäki, Finland
 Sanremo, Italy
 Wheaton, United States

See also
Karlskoga Mountain District

References

External links 

Karlskoga Municipality - Official site

 
Municipalities of Örebro County